Congress (Secular), is a political party in Kerala, India, formed after the split in Nationalist Congress Party in Kerala. It is led by Kadannappalli Ramachandran. It had one MLA, Kadannappalli Ramachandran from Kannur district.

References

Political parties in Kerala
Political parties with year of establishment missing